The 2022 Oslo Cup was held from September 2 to 4 at the Snarøya Curling Club in Oslo, Norway. The event was held in a round robin format with a purse of NOK 112,000 on the men's side and NOK 88,000 on the women's side. It was the first time the event has been held in ten years.

On the men's side, Niklas Edin and his Swedish rink of Oskar Eriksson, Rasmus Wranå, and Christoffer Sundgren capped off an undefeated tournament by beating Norway's Steffen Walstad 5–2 in the championship final. Both teams finished the round robin with a perfect 4–0 record and each won their quarterfinal and semifinal matches. It was the first event title for Team Edin of the 2022–23 season as they missed the playoffs at the 2022 Baden Masters, which Team Walstad won. In the third place game, Norway's Magnus Ramsfjell scored six in the first end to beat Scotland's James Craik 6–0. Lukas Høstmælingen, Ross Whyte, Kyle Waddell and Cameron Bryce all reached the quarterfinal round.

On the women's side, Sweden's Anna Hasselborg rink with Sara McManus, Agnes Knochenhauer, Sofia Mabergs and Johanna Heldin won 5–3 over Canada's Kaitlyn Lawes in the championship game. Team Hasselborg went 4–1 through the round robin and then beat Swedish rivals Isabella Wranå 8–0 in the semifinal, the team they lost to in the round robin. Team Lawes went a perfect 5–0 in the round robin and then beat Norway's Marianne Rørvik 6–4 in the semifinal. It was the first event for the new team of Lawes, Selena Njegovan, Jocelyn Peterman and Kristin MacCuish which formed following the dissolution of the Jennifer Jones and Tracy Fleury rinks. In the third place game, Team Wranå won 5–2 over Team Rørvik.

Men

Teams
The teams are listed as follows:

Round-robin standings
Final round-robin standings

Round-robin results 
All draw times are listed in Central European Summer Time (UTC+02:00).

Draw 1
Friday, September 2, 8:00 am

Draw 2
Friday, September 2, 10:30 am

Draw 3
Friday, September 2, 1:15 pm

Draw 4
Friday, September 2, 3:45 pm

Draw 5
Friday, September 2, 6:45 pm

Draw 6
Friday, September 2, 9:00 pm

Draw 8
Saturday, September 3, 10:00 am

Draw 9
Saturday, September 3, 12:45 pm

Draw 10
Saturday, September 3, 3:15 pm

Draw 11
Saturday, September 3, 5:45 pm

Playoffs

Source:

Quarterfinals
Sunday, September 4, 10:00 am

Semifinals
Sunday, September 4, 12:15 pm

Third place game
Sunday, September 4, 2:45 pm

Final
Sunday, September 4, 2:45 pm

Women

Teams
The teams are listed as follows:

Round-robin standings
Final round-robin standings

Round-robin results 
All draw times are listed in Central European Summer Time (UTC+02:00).

Draw 2
Friday, September 2, 10:30 am

Draw 3
Friday, September 2, 1:15 pm

Draw 4
Friday, September 2, 3:45 pm

Draw 5
Friday, September 2, 6:45 pm

Draw 7
Saturday, September 3, 7:30 am

Draw 9
Saturday, September 3, 12:45 pm

Draw 10
Saturday, September 3, 3:15 pm

Draw 12
Sunday, September 4, 7:45 am

Playoffs

Source:

Semifinals
Sunday, September 4, 12:15 pm

Third place game
Sunday, September 4, 2:45 pm

Final
Sunday, September 4, 2:45 pm

Notes

References

External links
Men's Event
Women's Event

2022 in Norwegian sport
2022 in curling
International sports competitions in Oslo
Curling competitions in Norway
September 2022 sports events in Europe